Brendan Eppert (born February 10, 1970) is an American speed skater. He competed in the men's 1000 metres event at the 1994 Winter Olympics.

References

External links
 

1970 births
Living people
American male speed skaters
Olympic speed skaters of the United States
Speed skaters at the 1994 Winter Olympics
Sportspeople from St. Louis